Haryo Heroe Syswanto Ns. Soerio Soebagio (18 July 1956 – 23 January 2018), better known as Sys NS, was an Indonesian radio personality and politician.

Biography

Early life and music career
Sys was born in Semarang, Central Java, on 18 July 1956. In the late 1960s he established an underground radio station with his elder brother. In 1970 Sys joined Prambors FM in Jakarta as a DJ and broadcaster. In 1975 Sys was chosen as Indonesia's best DJ.

In 1976 he and fellow Prambors employee Mochamad Noor came up with the idea for a teenage song-writing competition. For one song, "Lilin-Lilin Kecil", written by James F. Sundah, Sys felt as though he needed "someone with the voice of an angel". to sing "Lilin-Lilin Kecil", and in his opinion Chrisye fitted the role perfectly. Having heard Chrisye's voice on the indie album Guruh Gipsy (1976), Sys decided that he had exactly the voice required. After Jockie Soerjoprajogo and Imran Amir failed to convince the singer, Sys met him and showed Chrisye the lyrics; this led Chrisye to agree to sing the song. "Lilin-Lilin Kecil", despite coming in ninth place, went on to become the most commercial song of that year.

Sys made his film debut with a minor role in Sjumandjaja's film Kabut Sutra Ungu (Mist of Purple Silk), filmed in 1979. In 1980 he played in the film Seindah Rembulan (As Beautiful as the Moon); he was also instrumental in convincing Chrisye to join the cast. He continued working with Prambors and other radio stations throughout the 1980s, helping promote the comedy troupe Warkop and introducing tribute acts of Western bands. Sys went on the hajj to Mecca in 1989. Upon returning to Indonesia, he reportedly destroyed his collection of pornographic materials, condoms, and sex toys — which he had been collecting to open a museum — in response to his growing devotion towards Islam. By 1990 Sys had become vice president of Duta Media Citra Radio.

Politics
After the death of Ratno Timoer in 1998, Sys became the head of the Indonesian Film Performers' Association ( or PARFI). The following year he became active in politics, being elected as a member of the People's Consultative Assembly. In 2001, he helped found the Democratic Party.

In 2004 Sys' term as a representative finished. That same year, he campaigned extensively to have Susilo Bambang Yudhoyono elected as President of Indonesia. Afterwards, Sys found himself seemingly ignored by the party; in 2005 he campaigned to be chairman of the party, but lost to Yudhoyono's brother-in-law Hadi Utomo. In response, in 2006 Sys left the Democrats and founded the Party of the Unitary State of the Republic of Indonesia.

By 2009, Sys was secretary general of the Regional Unity Party. In 2011, he directed and sponsored a satirical pop opera entitled Cinta Anak Koruptor dan Pacarnya (Love of the Corrupter's Child and Partner) with Rp. 1 billion of his own money. The opera, held at Ismail Marzuki Park, sold out.

Personal life and death
He was married to Shanty Widhiyanti, with 3 children, Syanindita Trasysty, Sabdayagra Ahessa, and Sadhenna Sayanda.

On 23 January 2018, Sys died at Pondok Indah Hospital in Jakarta.

Filmography
Sys NS appeared in eight films.
Kabut Sutra Ungu (Mist of Purple Silk; 1980), as RobbySeindah Rembulan (As Beautiful as the Moon; 1980)Betapa Damai Hati Kami (How Peaceful Our Hearts; 1981)Sama-sama Enak (1987)Terang Bulan di Tengah Hari (Moon Shining at Noon; 1988), as Sony18++: Forever Love (2012)Loe Gue End (You and I are Done; 2012), as Alana's father17 Tahun ke Atas (17 and Up'', 2014)

Notes

References
Footnotes

Bibliography

External links

1956 births
2018 deaths
People from Semarang
Indonesian Muslims
Democratic Party (Indonesia) politicians
Indonesian radio presenters